Parathitarodes is a monotypic moth genus of the family Hepialidae. The only described species is Parathitarodes changi, which is found in Taiwan.

References

Moths described in 1999
Hepialidae
Monotypic moth genera
Moths of Asia